Angiomotin-like protein 2 is a protein that in humans is encoded by the AMOTL2 gene.

Angiomotin is a protein that binds angiostatin, a circulating inhibitor of the formation of new blood vessels (angiogenesis). Angiomotin mediates angiostatin inhibition of endothelial cell migration and tube formation in vitro. The protein encoded by this gene is related to angiomotin and is a member of the motins protein family.

References

External links

Further reading